Foveosa is a genus of spiders in the family Lycosidae. It was first described in 2007 by Russell-Smith, Alderweireldt & Jocqué. , it contains 5 species from Africa.

References

Lycosidae
Araneomorphae genera
Spiders of Africa